Ilir is an Albanian masculine given name, derived from i lirë, which means "Illyrian". It is also the Albanian way of referring to an "Illyrian" male.

People bearing the name include:
Ilir Azemi (born 1992), Kosovar footballer
Ilir Bajri (born 1969), Kosovar jazz composer, pianist
Ilir Bano, Albanian politician
Ilir Beqaj (born 1968), Albanian politician
Ilir Berisha (born 1991), Kosovar footballer
Ilir Biturku (born 1968), Albanian footballer 
Ilir Boçka (born 1950), Albanian diplomat
Ilir Bozhiqi (born 1965), Albanian footballer 
Ilirjan Çaushaj (born 1987), Albanian footballer
Ilir Dibra (born 1977), Albanian footballer
Ilir Duro (born 1966), Albanian footballer
Ilir Elmazovski (born 1979), Macedonian footballer
Ilir Hoxha (born 1949), son of former Albanian leader Enver Hoxha 
Ilir Jaçellari (born 1970), Albanian actor, painter and photographer
Ilir Kadia (born 1957), Albanian journalist
Ilir Kerni (born 1959), Albanian ballet dancer, opera and theater director
Ilir Latifi (born 1983), Swedish-Albanian mixed martial artist 
Ilir Rexhepi (born 1973), Kosovar actor
Ilir Meta (born 1969), Albanian politician, Prime Minister of Albania from 1999 to 2002, President since 2017
Ilir Nallbani (born 1982), Kosovar footballer 
Ilir Përnaska (born 1951), Albanian footballer
Ilir Rusmali (born 1965), Albanian politician
Ilir Selmani (born 1978), Kosovar basketball player
Ilir Seitaj (born 1957),  Albanian chess International Master
Ilir Shulku (born 1969), Albanian footballer

References

Albanian masculine given names